Héroes Albarracín District (used to be "Chucatamani" District) is one of eight districts of the province Tarata in Peru.

References